Hearts Are Wild is an American drama television series that aired on CBS on Fridays at 10:00 p.m Eastern time from January 10 to March 13, 1992. The series was filmed on location in Las Vegas, Nevada.  It was produced by Aaron Spelling and starred David Beecroft and Catherine Mary Stewart.

Premise
Hearts Are Wild centered on the guest and staff of Caesars Palace in Las Vegas. Among those shown were Jack Thorpe, the owner, Leon "Pepe" Pepperman, the manager, and Kyle Hubbard, the head of guest relations. Among the famous people who played guest were Dick Van Patten, Diana Muldaur, Mickey Rooney, Tom Bosley, Bonnie Franklin, Ricardo Montalbán, Khrystyne Haje, Barbara Rush, Irene Cara, and Gene Barry.

Cast
 David Beecroft as Jack Thorpe
 Jon Polito as Leon "Pepe" Pepperman
 Catherine Mary Stewart as Kyle Hubbard

Episodes

References

External links

CBS original programming
1992 American television series debuts
1992 American television series endings
1990s American drama television series
Television shows set in the Las Vegas Valley
English-language television shows